The Sultan of Johore (German: Der Sultan von Johore) is a 1917 German silent film directed by Harry Piel.

Cast
 Tilly Bébé 
 Aruth Wartan

References

Bibliography
 Matias Bleckman. Harry Piel: ein Kino-Mythos und seine Zeit. Filminstitut der Landeshaupstadt Düsseldorf, 1992.

External links

1917 films
Films of the German Empire
Films directed by Harry Piel
German silent feature films
Films set in India
Films set in the Arctic
German black-and-white films
1910s German films